is a Japanese manga artist pioneering in shōjo manga. She released her works in Shōjo Club and Margaret. According to Rachel Thorn, Nishitani "more or less single-handedly invented the school campus romance that remains the mainstay of shôjo manga today", and Robert Petersen regards her innovation as giving her characters personality.  She gave her readers characters that were like them, "teenaged Japanese girls dealing with friendships, family, school, and, yes, falling in love."  Her success inspired an influx of female manga artists. Her manga Mary Lou is thought to have opened up the idea of shōjo manga telling stories about ordinary teenagers.  Nishitani's characteristics have been described as 'big eyes and huge reflections within' as well as a use of curly hair and frilly clothes, with an attention to detail when drawing that inspired later artists like Nanae Sasaya.

Works
 (1964, Bessatsu Margaret)
 (1965, Margaret)
 (1966, Margaret)
 (1967, Margaret)
 (1967, Margaret)
 (1967, Margaret)
 (1968, Margaret)
 (1969, Margaret)
 (1971, Margaret)
 (1971, Margaret)
 (1972, Seventeen)
 (1974, Margaret)
 (1975, Shōjo Comic)
 (1976, LaLa)
 (1977, Hana to Yume)
 (1977, Margaret)
 (1978, Margaret)
 (1980, Margaret)
 (1980, Bouquet)
 (1981, Margaret)

References

Further reading

Yoshihiro Yonezawa, 1991. Kodomo no Shōwa-shi: Shōjo manga no sekai II, Shōwa 38 nen - 64 nen (子供の昭和史──少女マンガの世界 II 昭和38年〜64年 "A Children's History of Showa-Era Japan: The World of Shōjo Manga II, 1963-1989") Bessatsu Taiyō series. Tokyo: Heibonsha.

1943 births
Japanese female comics artists
Female comics writers
Manga artists
Women manga artists
People from Kōchi, Kōchi
Living people
20th-century Japanese women writers